Lucia Zucchetti is an Italian film editor. Born in Monza, Zucchetti became interested in film attending the ninth grade at ITSOS (Istituto tecnico statale ordinamento speciale), an experimental secondary school in Milan influenced by the free school movement of the 1960s. She graduated with a baccalaureate in film from the University of Westminster, where she became specialized in editing. In 2008, she received a BAFTA Award of Best Editing for Boy A (2007).

Partial filmography

Citations

References

External links
 

Alumni of the University of Westminster
American Cinema Editors
Italian film editors
Italian women film editors
People from Monza
Living people
Year of birth missing (living people)